The Conwy Valley line is a railway line in north-west Wales. It runs from Llandudno via Llandudno Junction to Blaenau Ffestiniog, and was originally part of the London and North Western Railway, being opened in stages to 1879. The primary purpose of the line was to carry slate from the Ffestiniog quarries to a specially built quay at Deganwy for export by sea. The line also provided goods facilities for the market town of Llanrwst, and via the extensive facilities at Betws-y-Coed on the London to Holyhead A5 turnpike road it served many isolated communities in Snowdonia and also the developing tourist industry.
Most of the stations along the line are treated as request stops.

History 
The first section from Llandudno Junction to Llanrwst (now called North Llanrwst) was built as the Conway and Llanrwst Railway and opened in 1863. The LNWR took over in 1863 and opened the extension to Betws-y-Coed in 1868.

The next extension was to Blaenau Ffestiniog to access the output of the large slate quarries there. At first the LNWR proposed a 2' narrow gauge railway via the steeply graded Lledr Valley to Blaenau Ffestiniog, this being the 'Bettws & Festiniog Railway'; authorisation was sought in November 1870. After construction began, it was decided that the extension would be built to standard gauge, allowing through running of trains. Between 1874 and 1879 the railway tunnel underneath Moel Dyrnogydd was bored, and in July 1879 a terminus was initially opened by the tunnel entrance. The line was subsequently extended by the best part of a mile to a terminus in the town, which opened 31 March 1881.

Blaenau Ffestiniog's other standard gauge railway, the Bala and Ffestiniog Railway, was closed to all traffic in 1961, and a portion was flooded in the creation of the Llyn Celyn reservoir. A rail connection was desired for the nuclear power station under construction at Trawsfynydd, and a connecting line was built from Blaenau Ffestiniog North to the site of the demolished Blaenau Ffestiniog Central station for freight use. With the reconstruction of the Ffestiniog Railway, passenger services were relocated to a new joint station on the site of the old Central station in 1982. Regular freight traffic to Trawsfynydd nuclear power station ceased in 1995, and the power station is being decommissioned.

The line's proximity to the River Conwy at its northern end has led to periodic problems with flooding over the years.  In 2004, 2005 and 2019 floods resulted in prolonged closures whilst the trackbed and embankments were rebuilt - the 2004 floods putting the line out of action from early February until 22 May that year.

The line was again closed from 27 December 2015 for seven weeks, after the formation was damaged by floodwater in more than 100 places following heavy rain on Boxing Day.

A further closure occurred between February and April 2017 after Storm Doris, when a tree fell on the track near Pont-y-Pant. Engineers had to move over 300 tonnes of rock and fallen vegetation during the recovery work.

In March 2019 the line closed again due to severe damage to infrastructure caused by Storm Gareth. The railway line reopened on 24 July 2019, in time for the National Eisteddfod near Llanrwst. 

Storm Ciara's heavy rainfall levels on 8-9 February 2020 once again caused damage to the trackbed near the Conwy estuary north of Llanrwst (closing the line yet again), with several sections having their ballast washed away. The line reopened on 28 September following repair work and additional mitigation work in vulnerable locations. Progress the repair work was partly affected by the COVID-19 pandemic.
 
The Ffestiniog tunnel has also given infrastructure operator Network Rail difficulties in recent years, with two separate closures (October 2017 and again in January 2019) required to repair water damage to the tunnel roof and a subsequent rockfall.

Modern services 
The line from Llandudno Junction to Blaenau is single track, and includes the longest single track railway tunnel in the United Kingdom (over ).

Between Llandudno Junction and Llandudno the service uses the double track Llandudno branch line from the North Wales Coast Line. The fully signalled passing loop at North Llanrwst is the last remaining between Llandudno Junction and Blaenau Ffestiniog and trains on the branch must stop at the signal box there to exchange tokens for the single line sections on either side.

The line is currently served by 6 trains per day in both directions from Monday to Saturday between Llandudno and Blaenau Ffestiniog (and vice versa), with the first two southbound services of the day starting (and first northbound service turning back) at Llandudno Junction and terminating in Blaenau Ffestiniog. The service is reduced to 4 trains per day in both directions on Sundays - this service now operates all year round, rather than in summer only as it did up until the winter 2019 timetable change.

The train service is operated by Transport for Wales Rail and is being marketed as the Conwy Valley Railway. A feature of the service is the availability on Conwy Valley trains as well as on local buses in Snowdonia of the new "Tocyn Taith" day ticket.

From 20 May 2007, Concessionary Travel Pass holders resident in Conwy and Gwynedd have been able to travel free of charge on the Conwy Valley Railway line between Llandudno and Blaenau Ffestiniog, as well as between Llandudno Junction and Llandudno on all Transport for Wales Rail services, as a result of funding provided by the Welsh Assembly Government.

A 2008 proposal would have seen the line upgraded to take slate from Blaenau Ffestiniog to the coast. The proposal, supported by Gwynedd Council, could have created 50 jobs in Blaenau Ffestiniog.

In 2013/14 an estimated 116,500 passenger journeys were made on the line, excluding exits and entries at the main line stations of Llandudno Junction, Deganwy and Llandudno. This was a small increase compared with the figure of 112,134 in 2012/13. Figures show that Blaenau Ffestiniog is the busiest of the line's stations with 44,828 passengers in 2013/14, followed by Betws-y-Coed with 35,400. Other stations have very low footfall with Dolgarrog attracting just 828 passengers in 2013/14.

In October 2018 operations transferred to the new franchise holder KeolisAmey Wales who  announced that they would use a British Rail Class 230 D-Train on the line in late 2019 replacing the British Rail Class 150 currently used on the line; however, this change still had not taken effect when the franchise was nationalised in February 2021.

Community rail
This is designated as a community rail partnership.

Steam workings

1998 the first steam working in the preservation era was to run back to Blaenau Ffestiniog from London behind a BR Standard 4 Tank no 80079. The first attempt up the route on 2 May 1998 ended in disaster as the engine stalled near Pont-y-Pant and due to the water supply running low resulted in the train having to be rescued and then returned to Llandudno. A second attempt the day later, this time with just 4 coaches instead of the previous 6 proved successful, with 80079 becoming the first standard gauge steam locomotive in Blaenau for 31 years.

On 1 May 1999 LMS black 5 no 45407 worked "The Conwy Climber" tour from Llandudno Junction to Blaenau Ffestiniog, from the lessons learnt with 80079 it was decided that although 45407 was a power class 5 engine (The BR standard being power class 4) 45407 would take a max of 4 coaches up the line while working solo. 45407 first took up 4 coaches to Blaenau without problems and then returned light engine to Llandudno Junction to collect the remaining four coaches, after this the eight coaches were coupled together for the return trip to Llandudno Junction.

Five months later on 17 October the BR Standard tank no 80079 returned for a rematch on the route, this time she was to haul 4 coaches instead of 6 and she was working the trip with another member of her class no 80098. Once again 80079 slipped to a stand near Pont-y-Pant and 80098, which had been waiting with the second portion of the train at Llanrwst, was detached to bank 80079 up to Blaenau. Thereafter the two engines double-headed the remaining 4 coaches before reforming the train to 8 coaches for the journey back to Llandudno.

In 2009, after a 10-year gap since the BR Standard tanks had worked up the route, The Railway Touring Company ran a special under the name "The Welsh Mountaineer" from Worcester to Blaenau Ffestiniog with 2 LMS Black 5's working the train from Llandudno Junction for the journey up the route to Blaenau.  The Black 5's chosen for the trip were Bert Hitchen's no 45231 The Sherwood Forester & Ian Riley's no 45407 The Lancashire Fusilier. The locos' support coaches were left at Llandudno for the journey, leaving them with a load of 9 coaches to take up the line's 1 in 47 gradient. After the success of this trip a number of regular "Welsh Mountaineer" trips are run on select Tuesdays from Preston to Blaenau during the summer months, and today these trips are still running. Unlike the trip with 45231 & 45407 which hauled 9 coaches, steam engines on their own owing to the gradient and curvature of the route are only permitted to haul a max of 6 coaches.

Other than the trip in 2009 which ran from Worcester the majority of trips ran from Preston to Blaenau running via Warrington and Frodsham before joining the North Wales Coast Line at Chester for the journey to Llandudno Junction. From Preston till Chester the engines run in the usual chimney first formation and from Chester after turning on the triangle the engine runs tender first to Llandudno Junction where the tour would reverse direction.

Storm Gareth damage and reopening special

In March 2019 the route was temporarily closed following multiple washouts along the route inflicted by Storm Gareth. The damage from the storm had left sections of the line suspended in the air as the embankments had been washed away, and other sections were under water which made the route unsafe for rail traffic. "Transport for Wales Rail" services had to be cancelled as a result of the damage inflicted and replacement bus services had to run calling at stations along the route while the line was closed to all rail traffic including charter trains.

Following repair work, the line from Llandudno Junction to North Llanwrst was re-opened on 24 July 2019; the rest of the route would reopen in August. To mark the full reopening of the line, Transport for Wales Rail in co-operation with West Coast Railways ran a train called "The Conwy Quest" which ran from Chester to Blaenau Ffestiniog via Llandudno Junction on Saturday 3 August.

The trip was to be worked by two steam locomotives and the two engines chosen for the trip were Chris Beet's LMS Jubilee Class no 45690 Leander & David Smith's LMS 8F Class no 48151. Like the run in 2009, the locos hauled 9 coaches up the branch, including the support coach, and the two engines ran tender first to Llandudno Junction but this time the trip was steam-hauled throughout instead of being hauled by a diesel to the junction.

Locos that have visited the route in recent years include: 45231 The Sherwood Forester, 45407 The Lancashire Fusilier, 45690 Leander, 46115 Scots Guardsman, 48151 and 61994 The Great Marquess.

Route

The following towns and villages are served by the line:

Llandudno
Deganwy
Llandudno Junction
for North Wales Coast Line
Glan Conwy
Tal-y-Cafn
Dolgarrog
Llanrwst (for Trefriw)
Betws-y-Coed
Pont-y-Pant railway station
Dolwyddelan
Roman Bridge railway station
Blaenau Ffestiniog
for Ffestiniog Railway

The original line terminated at the North Western station (where there were extensive slate yards) to the west of Blaenau Ffestiniog town centre. However, following the closure and removal of a section of the former Great Western Railway line from Bala, a short section of new railway was built alongside the Ffestiniog Railway Company's narrow gauge line in order to connect the Conwy Valley line with the isolated section of the GWR line, which had been retained to serve the nuclear power station at Trawsfynydd. Years later a new Blaenau Ffestiniog station was constructed in the centre of the town. Beyond the new station, the line was used only for goods traffic connected with Trawsfynydd, although occasional special passenger trains have been run at times. In recent years, the traffic from Trawsfynydd has ceased completely (the last charter special ran in October 1998) and the line has been disconnected from the Conwy Valley line just outside Blaenau Ffestiniog station.

There are connections at Llandudno Junction with the North Wales Coast Line (the main line between London and Holyhead) and at Blaenau Ffestiniog with the Ffestiniog Railway to Porthmadog.

References

Sources

Further reading

External links

Conwy Valley Railway – official site
Scenic Rail Britain: Conwy Valley Line

Railway lines in Wales
Rail transport in Gwynedd
Transport in Conwy County Borough
Community railway lines in Wales
Railway lines opened in 1879